Maliek Byndloss (born 21 March 1995) is a Jamaican male  BMX rider, representing his nation at international competitions. He competed in the time trial event at the 2015 UCI BMX World Championships.

In 2015, he won the Jamaican National BMX Championship.

References

External links
 
 

1995 births
Living people
BMX riders
Jamaican male cyclists
Pan American Games competitors for Jamaica
Cyclists at the 2015 Pan American Games
Place of birth missing (living people)